Cato is an unincorporated community located in the town of Cato, Manitowoc County, Wisconsin, United States. U.S. Route 10 also forced the razing of much of downtown Cato.

History 
Cato was originally known as Nettle Hills due to the abundant itchy weed before being renamed after a settler's hometown, Cato, New York. As a station along a train line from Manitowoc to Forest Junction, Cato averaged 8 trains a day. A school existed from the 1900s to 1930s and a Presbyterian church from then to the 1960s. The post office lasted for 128 years.

In 1992, a project to improve U.S. 10 required the purchase of the townsite and much of the downtown buildings to be razed, thus resulting in historical buildings coming down.

References

Unincorporated communities in Manitowoc County, Wisconsin
Unincorporated communities in Wisconsin